MacPherson Lake  is a lake of Guysborough Municipality, Nova Scotia, Canada. It is located a short distance from Port Shoreham Provincial Beach along Highway 344.  Yearly fishing derbies are held on the lake and many people with family roots in the area consider it their summer home.

See also
List of lakes in Nova Scotia

References
 National Resources Canada

Lakes of Nova Scotia